In Greek mythology, Theona or Theano (/θiˈænoʊ/; Ancient Greek: Θεανώ) was the wife of Amycus by whom she gave birth to her son, Mimas on the same night queen Hecabe's son Paris was born. Mimas was killed in exile, fighting alongside Aeneas in Italy, by Mezentius, king of the Etruscans.

Note 
Characters in Greek mythology

Reference 

 Vergil, Aeneid. Theodore C. Williams. trans. Boston. Houghton Mifflin Co. 1910. Online version at the Perseus Digital Library.